Spekkens is a surname. Notable people with the surname include:
Kristine Spekkens, Canadian astronomer
Robert Spekkens, Canadian theoretical quantum physicist
Spekkens toy model, quantum physics theory introduced by Robert Spekkens